Muraro is an Italian surname. Notable people with the surname include:

Carlo Muraro (born 1955), Italian footballer
Leonardo Muraro (born 1955), Italian politician
Roger Muraro (born 1959), French classical pianist
Rose Marie Muraro (1930–2014), Brazilian sociologist, writer, intellectual and feminist

Italian-language surnames